Neri Valen (26 September 1893 – 4 January 1954) was a Norwegian politician for the Liberal Party.

He was born in Bø.

He was elected to the Norwegian Parliament from Telemark in 1931, and was re-elected on four occasions. Shortly into his fifth term, he died and was replaced by Ketil Skogen.

Valen became a member of Bø municipality in 1919, and became mayor in 1922. From 1925 to 1931 he served as deputy mayor.

During the occupation of Norway by Nazi Germany he was imprisoned in Grini concentration camp from 24 November 1943, then in Berg concentration camp from 20 March 1944 to the occupation's end in May 1945.

References

1893 births
1963 deaths
Liberal Party (Norway) politicians
Members of the Storting
Mayors of places in Telemark
Norwegian resistance members
Grini concentration camp survivors
Berg concentration camp survivors
20th-century Norwegian politicians
People from Bø, Telemark